The women's high jump event at the 1999 Pan American Games was held on July 30. Juana Arrendel of the Dominican Republic had originally won the competition with a 1.93 metres jump but later tested positive for an illegal substance, stanozolol, and was stripped of her medal.

Results

References

Athletics at the 1999 Pan American Games
1999
1999 in women's athletics